The 2015 Supercopa Argentina Final was the 4th edition of the Supercopa, an annual football match contested by the winners of the Argentine Primera División and Copa Argentina competitions. Because Boca Juniors had won both competitions, San Lorenzo, the runners-up to the Argentine Primera División, were selected as the other finalist of Supercopa Argentina. San Lorenzo beat Boca Juniors 4–0 in Córdoba and won the trophy. As champions, San Lorenzo qualified to the 2016 Copa Sudamericana.

Qualified teams

Match

Details

Statistics

References 

2016 in Argentine football
2015
Supercopa Argentina 2015
Supercopa Argentina 2015